Pseudonacaduba is a genus of butterflies in the family Lycaenidae.

Species
Pseudonacaduba aethiops (Mabille, 1877)
Pseudonacaduba sichela (Wallengren, 1857)

External links
Pseudonacaduba at Markku Savela's Lepidoptera and some other life forms

Polyommatini
Lycaenidae genera